The 2016 Atlético de Kolkata season was the club's third season since its establishment in 2014 and their third season in the Indian Super League. This season will also be the first in which the club is coached by Spaniard José Francisco Molina, replacing Antonio López Habas who served as head coach the previous two seasons.

At the end of the season, Atlético de Kolkata came out as champions after defeating the Kerala Blasters in a penalty shootout, 4–3, during the final. The match had ended 1–1 after ninety minutes and extra time.

Background

Atlético de Kolkata entered the 2015 season as the first defending champions of the Indian Super League. Their title defense began on 3 October 2015 against Chennaiyin. A brace my new marquee, Hélder Postiga, helped Atlético de Kolkata win the match 3–2. They would go on the finish the regular season in second place, two points behind first place Goa. They would enter the finals facing off against Chennaiyin again. A 3–0 victory by Chennaiyin in the first leg all but sealed the fate for Kolkata, which was confirmed after Atlético de Kolkata could only manage a 2–1 victory in the second leg.

Player movement

Retained players

Foreign players

Indian players

Signings

In

Indian Super League

See also
 2016–17 in Indian football

References

ATK (football club) seasons
Atlético de Kolkata